Neomachlotica nebras is a species of sedge moth in the genus Neomachlotica. It was described by Edward Meyrick in 1909. It is found in Bolivia.

References

Moths described in 1909
Glyphipterigidae